literally means black cat in Japanese, and may refer to:

 Kuroneko, a 1968 Japanese horror film.
 Kuroneko (singer), a singer in Onmyo-Za
 Kuroneko-sama, a character from Trigun
 Ruri Gokō, a character from the light novel, manga, and anime series Oreimo nicknamed Kuroneko
 Kuroneko (wrestler), a Japanese professional wrestler

See also
 Yamato Transport or Kuroneko Yamato
 Black cat (disambiguation)
 Neko (disambiguation)